Still Alive and Well is an album by blues rock guitarist and singer Johnny Winter.  It was his fifth studio album, and his first since Johnny Winter And almost three years earlier.  It was released by Columbia Records in 1973.

Many of the songs on the album have a more rock-oriented power trio sound, with Randy Jo Hobbs playing bass and Richard Hughes on drums.  Rick Derringer, who produced, plays guitar on three tracks.  Still Alive and Well features two Rolling Stones songs — "Silver Train" and "Let It Bleed".

Critical reception

In Rolling Stone, Tony Glover wrote, "Yes, he is. In this long-awaited return album, Johnny Winter takes up where he left off. His fingers are fleet and sure as ever, his vocals have bite and growl, and the flash and power of yore are hanging right in there."

On AllMusic, James Chrispell said, "Still Alive and Well proved to the record-buying public that Johnny Winter was both. This is a truly enjoyable album, chock-full of great tunes played well."

Robert Christgau wrote, "Winter will never be an especially personable singer, but I like what's he's putting out on this monkey-off-my-comeback: two late-Stones covers, plenty of slide, and a good helping of nasty."

Track listing 
LP side one:
"Rock Me Baby" (Big Bill Broonzy, Arthur Crudup) - 3:48
"Can't You Feel It" (Dan Hartman) - 2:54
"Cheap Tequila" (Rick Derringer) - 4:04
"All Tore Down" (Joe Crane) - 4:28
"Rock & Roll" (Johnny Winter) - 4:51
LP side two:
"Silver Train" (Mick Jagger, Keith Richards) - 3:37
"Ain't Nothing to Me" (Leon Payne(as Pat Patterson)) - 3:06
"Still Alive & Well" (Derringer) - 3:43
"Too Much Seconal" (Winter) - 4:20
"Let It Bleed" (Jagger, Richards) - 4:09
Bonus tracks on remastered release:
"Lucille" (Richard Penniman) - 2:45
"From a Buick 6" (Bob Dylan) - 2:38

"Can't You Feel It" is incorrectly listed as 5.04 on early pressings.

Personnel 
Musicians
Johnny Winter – guitar, slide guitar, mandolin, vocals
Randy Jo Hobbs – bass
Richard Hughes – drums
Rick Derringer – slide guitar on "Silver Train", pedal steel guitar and click guitar on "Ain't Nothing to Me", electric guitar on "Cheap Tequila"
Jeremy Steig – flute on "Too Much Seconal"
Todd Rundgren – Mellotron on "Cheap Tequila"
Mark Klingman – piano on "Silver Train"
Production
Producer: Rick Derringer
Reissue Producer: Bob Irwin
Digitally Remastered: Vic Anesini
Cover Design: John Berg, Ed Lee

Legacy
New York hard rock band Circus of Power, covered and released the Derringer song "Still Alive and Well" on their 1989 live EP Still Alive....
Austin, Texas-based singer/songwriter/guitarist Carolyn Wonderland covered "Still Alive and Well" on her 2008 album, Miss Understood.

References

1973 albums
Johnny Winter albums
Albums produced by Rick Derringer
Columbia Records albums